The dirac (see Baati for the house dress) is a Somali garment worn by Somali women that is long, usually ankle length.

Types
Bacwayne/half bac/bacyare dirac, simply known as dirac is one most commonly worn during celebrations/special events such as weddings, parties, festivals etc. It is usually made out of either chiffon, silk (which are both usually the sheerest variation of dirac) or velvet (one of the least see-through), amongst many other materials. It is always accompanied with an ankle length underskirt called gorgorad/googarad and a wrap/shawl called garbasaar which is either worn loosely around the head or neatly on one shoulder. The dirac can also be wrapped in a Guntiino style which is known as dirac guntiino.

The above style of dirac is not worn by Somali brides, instead they wear a variation known as a Bridal dirac, which is simply an embroidered dirac with a gold belt, along with an embroidered garbasaar.

Baati/dirac shiid is yet another variation traditionally worn as a house dress and is made of cotton. This version is very popular within the entirety of East Africa due to Somali trading within those countries and is seen as a staple clothing.

History
The Dirac originated from the coast of North-western Somalia, when it was created by a group of Somali women around the 1700-1800's but was popularised in the early/mid 1900's in Northern Somalia/Djibouti, with bacwayne, translating to "big baggy", being popularised in Djibouti in the 1950s to 1970's.  
 It then gradually spread to the rest of the Somali regions, slowly replacing the usage of a much older, traditional layered article of clothing called Sadex Qayd and it’s single-layered offshoot Guntiino. It was made with colourful fabric, mainly locally made but some imported. The dirac was then adopted by neighbouring countries such as parts of Kenya, Yemen and Ethiopia, as well as Tanzania, Zanzibar and Oman due to Somali traders/merchants and the general diaspora that migrated to these regions.

The dirac set (dirac, gorgarad and garbasaar) is most likely a flashy derivative of the older traditional Somali style of dress called Sadex qayd due to the similarities of layering between the two.

See also
• Guntiino

References

African clothing
Somali culture